Helen Wood may refer to:

 Helen Wood (judge), Australian judge
 Helen Wood (television personality) (born 1986), Big Brother contestant
 Helen Adelaide Wood (died 1927), British botanical artist and scientific illustrator
 Helen Wood (actress) (1917–1988), American actress
 Helen Wood (actress, 1935) (1935–1998), American dancer, mainstream actress and (as Dolly Sharp) pornographic actress
 Helen M. Wood, American computer scientist

See also
 Helen Atkinson-Wood (born 1955), English actress and comedian
 Helen Woods (disambiguation)
 Ellen Wood (disambiguation)